Erkki Rapo (July 2, 1946 – February 28, 2004), also known as "Uncle Eki" and to international celebrities as "Eric", was a Finnish amateur autograph collector. He dedicated the last 40 years of his life to his hobby, and is among its best-known practitioners worldwide.

Biography
Erkki Rapo lived a rather nomadic, lonely life. He had a series of odd jobs, including stints as limousine driver, club MC and porter at a local university campus. However, autograph hunting was his passion and he never held a job for long. He never married, and his apartment has been described by those who visited it as "chaotic". One of his few friends was Jukka Häkkinen who served as Rapo's personal driver from the late 1980s until his death. Rapo was diagnosed with diabetes as a child and suffered from the condition throughout his life.

Rapo's celebrity encounters began in 1959 when he met Paul Anka before a concert in Helsinki. Over the following years Rapo made it his mission to meet other famous people in person, and he would spend hours planning and executing his autograph-hunting campaigns. In 1966 Rapo met The Beatles and managed to obtain all four signatures, which is considered something of a rarity because only John Lennon and Paul McCartney are regarded by autograph experts as consistent autograph signers. Rapo also met and obtained autographs from Jim Morrison, Frank Sinatra, Plácido Domingo, Boris Yeltsin, Pope John Paul II and various other celebrities and notables. Tom Jones considered Rapo a personal friend, even though his visits to Finland were limited by his tour schedules.

Along with the album covers, magazines and similar items favoured by autograph hunters, Rapo is said to have had supermarket receipts, plain paper and other odd items signed. He is said to have regularly carried autographed items with him, and many times he would try to sell these or offer them to a gas station or food store owner in return for gas or meals. Sometimes, if a buyer thought his prices were too high, he would photocopy the signed item and sell a fake autograph, albeit for less money than originally asked for.

As a result of his activities Rapo became a celebrity himself in Finland. He appeared several times in Finnish newspapers alongside the individual whose autograph he was seeking, and curious readers called the newspapers to ask about him. This motivated journalists to find out more about Rapo, and his life was later chronicled in Finland through newspaper interviews and articles.

In 1988 Rapo's collection was displayed at the Martinus Hall in Vantaa.

Bob Dylan incidents
Rapo tried to obtain Bob Dylan's autograph on a number of occasions. Dylan apparently disliked this. There are accounts of a 1989 encounter between Dylan and Rapo in Helsinki, where Dylan allegedly shouted at Rapo to stop following him. Rapo nevertheless went the next day to Dylan's hotel but Dylan, signing autographs for a younger crowd, left the area upon spotting Rapo.

In 1996, Rapo and Dylan crossed paths again, at a music festival. According to Rapo, Dylan told him that he didn't like giving autographs to adults, and stepped away.

Later years
Rapo did not stop autograph hunting until late in his life when, affected by diabetes complications, he scheduled fewer autograph-seeking dates. Rapo's illness forced him to stay at home for a large part of his final few years, until he died in 2004. His death was relayed by Finnish newspapers to readers across the nation.

Auction
Shortly after Rapo's death, his autograph collection was auctioned by well known dealer Martin Sinisalo in Helsinki. His biography "Hei anna nimmari - Eki-Sedän stoori" by Tomi Lindblom & Jukka Hakkinen was published in 2006.

References
 
 
 

1946 births
2004 deaths
Finnish collectors